Jiří Dienstbier (20 April 1937 – 8 January 2011) was a Czech politician and journalist.

Biography
Born in Kladno, he was one of Czechoslovakia's most respected foreign correspondents before being fired after the Prague Spring. Unable to have a livelihood as a journalist, he worked as a janitor for the next two decades. During this time, he secretly revived the suppressed Lidové noviny newspaper.

After the end of communist rule in 1989, he became the country's first non-Communist foreign minister in four decades, a post he held until 1992. Shortly after his appointment in December 1989, Dienstbier and Minister of National Defence Miroslav Vacek called for the withdrawal of 75,000 Soviet troops who had been stationed in the country since the 1968 Warsaw Pact invasion of Czechoslovakia.

In 2008, he was elected to the Czech Senate for the Kladno region. He died on 8 January 2011 in Prague's Vinohrady Hospital.

Awards and honors
In 2000, the Vienna-based International Press Institute named him one of its 50 World Press Freedom Heroes of the past 50 years. In 2013, Dienstbier was posthumously awarded the Hanno R. Ellenbogen Citizenship Award given jointly by the Prague Society for International Cooperation and Global Panel Foundation.

References

External links
 Senate page
 Personal website

1937 births
2011 deaths
Charles University alumni
Politicians from Kladno
Charter 77 signatories
Czech human rights activists
Czech democracy activists
Czechoslovak dissidents
Foreign ministers of Czechoslovakia
Government ministers of Czechoslovakia
Recipients of the Legion of Honour
Civic Forum politicians
Civic Movement Government ministers
Janitors